Evgeny Finkel or Eugene Finkel is a political scientist and historian at Johns Hopkins University who studies political violence, genocide, East European and Israeli politics, and Holocaust studies. In April 2022, Finkel claimed that after the initial phase of the 2022 Russian invasion of Ukraine was resisted by Ukrainian armed forces, the aims of the invasion evolved, and the combined evidence of widespread war crimes, including the Bucha massacre, together with genocidal intent, as illustrated by the essay What Russia should do with Ukraine published in RIA Novosti, established that genocide was taking place.

Childhood and education
Evgeny Finkel was born in Lviv. Finkel and his family moved to Israel when he was 13 years old. He holds a Bachelor of Arts in political science and international relations from Hebrew University of Jerusalem and a PhD in political science from University of Wisconsin-Madison.

Research career
, Finkel's research fields included political violence, genocide, East European and Israeli politics, and Holocaust studies.

Russia–Israel relation in the Syrian civil war
In comments on the Syrian civil war in April 2018, Finkel stated that even though Israel was opposed to the government of Bashar al-Assad, which was supported by Russia, Israel and Russia had common interests in opposition to Islamic State (ISIS/ISIL) and al-Qaeda, and in preventing the war from extending beyond the borders of Syria. According to Finkel, the Israeli and Russian militaries coordinated closely in order to prevent direct conflict between their forces and to prevent a major escalation of the war.

Media statements

2022 Russian invasion of Ukraine

In early April 2022, following the Bucha massacre of the 2022 Russian invasion of Ukraine, Finkel argued that the initial intent of the invasion was unlikely to have been genocide, but that the "combination of [the] violence, widespread and deliberate, and the rhetoric" showed that the intent and actions had evolved into genocide. Finkel stated that he had often criticised governments for misusing the term "genocide". In the case of the 2022 invasion of Ukraine, he stated that the massacres demonstrated "a campaign intended to destroy Ukrainians as a national group, if not in whole, then certainly 'in part'". He argued that evidence of a switch to genocidal intent was "abundant", and that the 3 April essay, What Russia should do with Ukraine published by RIA Novosti was one of the best examples, similar to earlier statements by Russian president Vladimir Putin, and "outlin[ing] a clear plan to destroy Ukrainians and Ukraine itself". Finkel stated that the publication of the article in a major state controlled news medium was necessarily approved "from above".

Works

References

Living people
Johns Hopkins University faculty
Ukrainian emigrants to Israel
Historians of the Holocaust
Year of birth missing (living people)